Metropark station is an intermodal transportation hub on the Northeast Corridor in the Iselin section of Woodbridge Township in Middlesex County, New Jersey that is located 24.6 miles southwest of New York Penn Station. It is owned and operated by NJ Transit and serves Amtrak and NJ Transit's Northeast Corridor Line. NJ Transit runs peak period 'loop' buses in coordination with train schedules.

The station is near the interchange of Route 27 and Garden State Parkway near exits 131 and 132. and has a multi-story parking facility that is open at all times.

The station, built by the New Jersey Department of Transportation (NJDOT) and the United States Department of Transportation, opened on November 14, 1971, as Garden State Metropark. It was built as a suburban park-and-ride stop for the then-new high-speed rail Metroliners.

History

Metropark was one of two park-and-ride infill stations proposed in the 1960s for use by the new Metroliners, the other being Capital Beltway in Lanham, Maryland, just outside Washington, D.C. The two stations were originally named Capital Beltway Metropark and Garden State Metropark; these were shortened to Capital Beltway and Metropark. Both were conceived as public-private partnerships. Under a plan put forward in late 1968 by the New Jersey Department of Transportation (NJDOT) the state would contribute $648,000 toward the cost of the station, then estimated at $1.4 million.

Amtrak service to Metropark began on November 14, 1971. The station's cost had increased to $2.6 million, shared by NJDOT and the United States Department of Transportation. It was next to the Garden State Parkway to allow easy access by automobile; a large business park – "the first Edge City in the world to grow from a parking lot" – soon grew near the station. Commuter trains continued to use Iselin station, half a mile east. 

The station was renamed Harrison A. Williams Metropark Station in 1979, in recognition of US Senator Williams' (D-NJ) support for its construction.  However, the name was removed from the station after his 1980 conviction for bribery and conspiracy in the Abscam scandal.

Renovation

In January 2007, NJ Transit announced a nearly $30 million renovation plan for the station, to be completed by 2010. Reconstruction was completed by Anselmi & DeCicco, Inc. of Maplewood, NJ in summer 2009, and cost $47 million. Climate-controlled shelters and LCD train information systems were installed, platforms were extended to accommodate 12-car trains,  canopies were lengthened and the station building was enlarged as part of the project. New signage was also installed; all of the new signs refer to the station as "Metropark Station".

Ridership
Since 2001, Metropark has been the busiest New Jersey Transit station apart from the city terminals. Many commuters from the South Shore of Staten Island utilize the station to commute to Manhattan. Along with Princeton Junction in 2006, Metropark was the first non-terminal station to have over 7,000 weekday boardings.

Layout and services

The station is served by NJ Transit Rail Operations Northeast Corridor Line. The station has two high-level side platforms flanking the four tracks of the Northeast Corridor. Amtrak's long-haul services and most Keystone Service trains that utilize the Northeast Corridor bypass the station via the inner tracks, as do some NJ Transit express trains. Until 2005, the eastbound  also stopped at Metropark. Amtrak trains skip most other stations between Trenton and Newark Penn Station, but many trains stop at Metropark despite having to switch to the outside (local) tracks to do so.  Pairs of 45-mph crossovers (interlockings MENLO and ISELIN) just east and west of the station were added about 1986 to make this easier.

Five peak-hour "Metropark Loop" routes, operated by NJ Transit as bus routes 801–805, connect the station to the surrounding office parks and residential areas.

References

External links

Metropark (USA RailGuide – TrainWeb)
 Station from Google Maps Street View

NJ Transit Rail Operations stations
NJ Transit bus stations
Amtrak stations in New Jersey
Stations on the Northeast Corridor
Railway stations in Middlesex County, New Jersey
Woodbridge Township, New Jersey
Railway stations in the United States opened in 1971